The Constitution Alteration (Nationalization of Monopolies) Bill 1919, was an unsuccessful Australian referendum seeking to alter the Australian Constitution to extend the government's power to legislate in respect of monopolies. The question was put to a referendum in 1919, held in conjunction with the 1919 federal election.

Question 

The proposal was to alter the text of section 51 of the Constitution as reads as follows:

51a.—(1.) The Parliament shall have power to make laws for carrying on by or under the control of the Commonwealth, the industry or business of producing, manufacturing, or supplying any specified goods, or of supplying any specified services, and for acquiring for that purpose on just terms the assets and goodwill of the industry or business, where each House of the Parliament has in the same Session, by resolution passed by an absolute majority of its members, referred to the High Court, for inquiry and report by a Justice thereof, the question whether the industry or business is the subject of a monopoly, and where, after the report of the Justice has been received, each House of the Parliament has, in one Session, by resolution passed by an absolute majority of its members, declared that the industry or business is the subject of a monopoly.

Results
Do you approve of the proposed law for the alteration of the Constitution entitled 'Constitution Alteration (Nationalization of Monopolies) 1919'?

Discussion 
The 1911 referendum asked a single question that dealt with the acquisition of monopolies, trade, commerce and industrial . The second resolution separated the laws in relation to monopolies and the acquisition of monopolies into different questions. On each of the many occasions a similar question was asked at a referendum the public decided not to vest power in the Commonwealth over these matters.

 1911 referendum on trade and commerce, industrial relations and monopolies
 1913 referendum on monopolies

References

1919 referendums
Referendum (Monopolies)
1919 (Monopolies)